900 series or series 900 or variation, may refer to:

 900 series (bowling), three consecutive perfect games by an individual bowler
 AMD 900 chipset series, set of chipsets released in 2011
 Euskotren 900 series, a train type
 GeForce 900 series, family of graphics processing units developed by Nvidia
 Karosa 900 series, collective term for several modifications of a bus which was produced by Czech company Karosa in the town Vysoké Mýto from 1994 to 2007
 Lotus 900 series, their first self-developed engine
 Saab 900, an automobile
 Volvo 900 Series, range of executive cars produced from 1990 to 1998

See also

 

 S900 (disambiguation)
 Series (disambiguation)